The NECW Tag Team Championship is a professional wrestling tag team title in New England Championship Wrestling. The title was later unified with the PWF Mayhem Tag Team title.  NECW closed on November 6, 2010, and the championship was retained by PWF Northeast with Da Hoodz recognized as the champions.

Title history

References

External links
NECW Tag Team Championship History
 NECW Tag Team Championship
Tag team wrestling championships